Santo Tomás del Norte is a municipality in the Chinandega department of Nicaragua.

Santo Tomas is a small town surrounded by the Guasaule river. It divides Nicaragua and Honduras.

Municipalities of the Chinandega Department